was a town located in Aso District, Tochigi Prefecture, Japan.

As of 2003, the town had an estimated population of 12,011 and a density of 131.04 persons per km2. The total area was 91.66 km2.

On February 28, 2005, Kuzū, along with the town of Tanuma (also from Aso District), was merged into the expanded city of Sano.

References 

Dissolved municipalities of Tochigi Prefecture